Don Pearce (21 February 1941 – 13 February 1999) was an Australian cricketer. He played two first-class matches for Tasmania between 1967 and 1969.

See also
 List of Tasmanian representative cricketers

References

External links
 

1941 births
1999 deaths
Australian cricketers
Tasmania cricketers
Cricketers from Tasmania